The Atlantic 75 is part of the B-class of lifeboats that serve the shores of the United Kingdom as a part of the RNLI inshore fleet.

The Atlantic 75 is the second generation Rigid Inflatable Boat (RIB) in the B-class series, developed from the Atlantic 21. These boats gradually replaced the Atlantic 21 fleet, but have now been superseded by the new Atlantic 85-class lifeboat.

Description
One of the main improvements made to the Atlantic 75 is the addition of a ballast tank at the front of the boat which enables the boat to launch into larger surf than the Atlantic 21. The ballast when full, either of sea water or water from a hose, weighs the same as three fully grown men.

Fleet

References

External links 

RNLI Fleet: B-class (Atlantic)
Atlantic 75 class lifeboat at Burnham-on-Crouch RNLI Lifeboat Station